The Omega Code is a 1999 apocalyptic thriller film directed by Rob Marcarelli, written by Stephen Blinn and Hollis Barton, and starring Casper Van Dien, Michael York, Catherine Oxenberg and Michael Ironside. The premillennialist plot revolves around a plan by the Antichrist (York) to take over the world using information hidden in the titular Bible code.

The independently produced film was financed and distributed by the Trinity Broadcasting Network, whose head, televangelist Paul Crouch, wrote a novelization of the film's screenplay. The film received a limited theaterical release in the United States on October 15, 1999, grossing	$12 million against a $7.2 million budget, before being released on home video by GoodTimes Entertainment.

In 2001, the film had a sequel  entitled Megiddo: The Omega Code 2, which serves partly as a prequel as well as an alternate retelling of the first film's eschatological plot. While it had a significantly larger budget than the original, it was less enthusiastically received, and was ultimately less popular.

Plot

In Jerusalem, a rabbi named Rostenburg is using software he designed to decode seventy eschatological prophecies hidden within the Torah. Rostenburg has handwritten each one in a journal, to be entered into the program for deciphering. The program deciphers a prophecy which says that he is about to die; immediately, he tears the page containing the final code from his journal, hiding it in his shirt pocket. He is then shot and killed by an assassin, who takes his journal and the optical disc containing the decoding program. After the assassin leaves, two mysterious men (later revealed to be two prophets) retrieve the journal page Rostenburg had hidden.

Television reporter and talk show host Cassandra Barris (Catherine Oxenberg) introduces Dr. Gillen Lane (Casper Van Dien) as her show's guest. Lane is a popular author and charismatic motivational speaker who explains that codes hidden in the Old Testament describe events past, present, and future; he sees no contradiction between this belief and his dismissal of religious faith.

Media mogul and European Union Chairman Stone Alexander (Michael York) receives a humanitarian award in Rome for having all but eliminated world hunger through advances in nutritional technology. There, we see that the man who killed Rostenburg and stole his decoding software is Alexander's apprentice, Dominic (Michael Ironside). Dr. Lane is in attendance, seeking to meet with Alexander "to discuss some ideas." Cassandra, employed by one of Alexander's television networks, is also in attendance, providing Lane brief conversation after Alexander spurns him. Some time afterward, however, Alexander sees a prophecy (deciphered with Rostenberg's program) that leads him to ask Lane to become his Minister of Information.

Using each prophecy Rostenburg's program deciphers to guide him, Alexander works toward world domination by whatever means he deems necessary, including secretly arranging for the bombings of Muslim and Jewish holy sites in Israel. Reporting from Jerusalem, Cassandra is caught up in one of the blasts. The two prophets from Rostenburg's study take her from the rubble, telling her that they have "a message for [her] to carry".  Alexander goes on to use the sites' rebuilding to help forge a groundbreaking Middle East peace treaty. Not long thereafter, most national governments agree to join a ten-state "World Union", of which Alexander is chairman. Lane finds fulfillment in his new position, though he regrets not being able to be with his estranged wife and young daughter.

Cassandra delivers to Lane a warning that the prophets gave her, though he is skeptical. Nevertheless, the warning leads Lane to discover the decoding facility where Alexander's staff uses Rostenburg's program. No one else is in the facility at the time, but Lane sees that the program is running, and leafs through printouts of previously deciphered codes. Seeing Lane on a surveillance feed, Alexander and Dominic go to confront him. A disillusioned Lane accuses Alexander of "following the code like a script," and being behind the Israeli bombings. Confessing to Lane's charges, Alexander asks him to be "my spokesman for this new world, my visionary, my prophet." Believing himself to be the only rightful aspirant to the position, Dominic shoots Alexander in the head, mortally wounding him. Dominic immediately alerts security, claiming that Lane shot Alexander and fled. Lane escapes Alexander's compound, but becomes the target of a worldwide manhunt. Alexander is pronounced dead at a local hospital.

Lane runs into a sympathetic Cassandra, who agrees to smuggle him onto a network jet so that he can return to his family in Los Angeles. Meanwhile, Satan enters Alexander's body in the hospital, causing his head wound to heal miraculously and the World Union chairman to rise from the dead. Seven of the ten World Union leaders agree that Alexander will be appointed "Chancellor of the United World" in a ceremony to be held at the Temple Mount in Jerusalem, coincident with the reopening of Solomon's Temple. In Los Angeles, it becomes clear that Lane cannot be safely reunited with his family, which is under heavy surveillance. He and Cassandra end up flying back to Jerusalem, where the prophets give him the page of Rostenburg's journal containing the final code. Immediately thereafter, Cassandra pulls a gun on Lane, demanding the code and revealing that she is loyal to Alexander.

At the ceremony in Jerusalem, Chairman Alexander (now Chancellor Alexander) proclaims that he has "become king and god!" The crowd is upset by this statement, with some devout Jewish and Muslim listeners denouncing him as a blasphemer. Out of the growing tumult, the two prophets appear inside the temple, identifying Alexander as the Abomination of Desolation, quoting evangelistic biblical prophecies, and predicting that they would be resurrected three days after their deaths. Alexander has Dominic kill them both, and put them on display as an example of what happens to those who oppose him. He leaves for his compound in Rome, as Dominic relays word to him that "the Israelis and several others are seceding." Alexander plots a massive military action, including a nuclear strike.

Alexander meets Cassandra, who gives him the final code; when he examines the writing, it evaporates from the page supernaturally. Alexander accuses her of conspiring with Lane (who is being detained on-site). The two of them go to Lane's holding cell, where Dominic violently interrogates him as to the whereabouts of the final code. Lane is truly ignorant of its whereabouts, causing the interrogation to reach an impasse. Lane is left alone in his cell. In his solitude, demons swirl around him, tormenting him; Lane prays, "God... Jesus, save me." Immediately, the demons are scattered, Lane's cell door opens, and he exits. Meanwhile, the two prophets are resurrected.

Lane, trying to find Alexander, runs into Dominic instead. Dominic is about to kill him when the two prophets supernaturally appear. They strangle Dominic without touching him, and give Lane the journal page with the final code. Lane takes Dominic's gun and confronts Alexander, who, with Cassandra at his side, is about to commence the attack. Alexander uses this as a bargaining chip to get Lane to give him the final code; Lane agrees, typing it into Rostenburg's program for deciphering. Once he does, however, Alexander reveals that he never intended to call off the attack, and now, with the final code, will begin his massive war. Just as Alexander is about to give the final authorization to attack, a blindingly brilliant and pure white light appears on the horizon, expanding like a shockwave through the entire surrounding area. As it reaches Alexander's war room, its appearance is accompanied by a strong wind. While Lane stands safely and peacefully within it, it blows through Alexander violently enough to cause Satan to fly behind him. Initially attempting to grasp onto Alexander's shoulders for stability, Satan is finally blown away, out of sight. At this point, Alexander reaches behind his ear and finds that his hand is bloodied: His head wound was restored after Satan was ejected from him, leaving him dead again.

The shockwave of light spreads to cover the entire Earth, then grows in brightness and intensity such that it causes the entire screen to remain white for a few seconds. This effect ends with a fade to the printer in Alexander's facility, the output tray of which bears a freshly-printed page with Rostenburg's final code, deciphered as follows: "0000 ... Dawn of New Millennium".

Cast 
 Casper Van Dien as Gillen Lane
 Michael York as Stone Alexander/The Antichrist
 Catherine Oxenberg as Cassandra Barashe
 Michael Ironside as Dominic
 Devon Odessa as Jennifer Lane
 William Hootkins as Sir Percival Lloyd
 Robert Ito as Shimoro Lin Che
 Steve Franken as Jeffries
 Janet Carroll as Dorothy Thompson
 George Coe as Senator Jack Thompson
 Ravil Isyanov as Rykoff
 Ayla Kell as Maddie Lane
 Jan Triska as Prophet
 Terry Rhoads as Reporter Matthews
 Lise Simms as Talk show host
 Robert F. Lyons as General

Production and distribution 
The film was produced by Code Productions in conjunction with Eclipse Catering, TBN's Gener8Xion Entertainment and TBN Films. It was first aired on Trinity Broadcasting Network in 1999, and then distributed by the now bankrupt Good Times Home Video Corporation to both VHS and DVD formats in 2000, and released over the internet in 2002.
 
 Other distributors

 Higher Dreams (1999) (Spain) (theatrical)
 Providence Entertainment (1999) (USA, theatrical)
 At Entertainment (2000) (Japan, on video)
 Eagle Entertainment (2001) (Australia, theatrical)
 Argentina Video Home (Argentina, video)
 Califórnia Home Vídeo (Brazil, VHS only)
 Dutch FilmWorks (DFW) (2001) (Netherlands only on DVD)
 GoodTimes Home Video (2000) (2002) (USA, only on DVD)
 Laurus Entertainment (2001) (Netherlands) (VHS)
 RTL Entertainment (2003) (Netherlands) (TV, RTL5) (broadcast premiere)

Influences
The prophets' public denunciation of Alexander as the Anti-Christ, their immediate death at the hands of his primary enforcer, and subsequent resurrection from the dead, are drawn from "A Short Tale of the Anti-Christ" by Russian Orthodox theologian and philosopher Vladimir Solovyov. In Solovyov's depiction, however, they are instead the three leaders of the world's remaining Roman Catholics, Eastern Orthodox, and conservative Protestants.

Reception
The film received mostly negative reviews. Rotten Tomatoes gives The Omega Code a rating of 8%, based on reviews from 25 critics, with the critic consensus being “Mysticism, overacting, and overall gimcrackery eventually weigh down the story.”, as well as an average grade of 14/100 from Metacritic, based on 9 critic reviews.

Joe Leydon, writing in Variety, describes the movie as "laughably simplistic and confoundingly muddled." Chris Willman of Entertainment Weekly wrote that the film "gives 'Great Tribulation' new meaning," and give the film an overall grade D−. MaryAnn Johanson called Casper Van Dien's acting "shocking[ly] incompeten[t]."

References

External links
 
 
 
 The Omega Code at The Numbers
 The Omega Code (Official Website)

1999 films
1999 independent films
1990s thriller films
Christian apocalyptic films
Fictional depictions of the Antichrist
Films scored by Alan Howarth (composer)
Films scored by Harry Manfredini
Films about Christianity
Films about religion
Films set in Italy
Films set in Rome
Films shot in Rome
American independent films
1990s English-language films
1990s American films